The Board of Veterans' Appeals (BVA) is an administrative tribunal within the United States Department of Veterans Affairs (VA), located in Washington, D.C. Established by Executive Order on July 28, 1933, it determines whether U.S. military veterans are entitled to claimed veterans' benefits and services.  The Board's mission is to conduct hearings and decide appeals properly before the Board in a timely manner. The Board's jurisdiction extends to all questions in matters involving a decision by the Secretary under a law that affects a provision of benefits by the Secretary to Veterans, their dependents, or their Survivors. Final decision on such appeals are made by the Board based on the entire record in the proceedings and upon consideration of all evidence and applicable provisions of law and regulation.  The Board's review is de novo.

In Fiscal Year 2020, the Board issued over 102,000 decisions, surpassing the records set in FY 2018 and 2019 for Veterans and their families, which is the highest number of decisions issued by the Board since the 1988 enactment of the Veterans' Judicial Review Act (VJRA), which established the United States Court of Appeals for Veterans Claims (CAVC).  The Fiscal Year (FY) 2018 total of 85,288 decisions is a 62% increase over the FY 17 total of 52,537. Additionally, the Board held 16,422 hearings. The Board continued its improved output and hearings in 2019, 2020, and 2021 - nearly doubling the number of decisions held in 4 years' time -increasing decisions issued to more than 100,000 and hearings held to over 23,000. Additionally, the Board implemented innovative changes ranging from the Interactive Decision Template tool to Virtual Tele-hearing opportunities using cell phones. The Board began a strong recruitment of veterans and military spouses across several positions to include Veterans Law Judges, attorneys, and administrative and operations personnel to enhance and improve service to veterans and their families.

Structure of the Board

Board Executives 
The Board is led by a chairman, a vice chairman, a senior deputy vice chairman, four deputy vice chairmen, an executive director for appellate support, and chief counsel.  The Chairman ranks equivalent to a department Assistant Secretary and is nominated by the President and confirmed by the Senate for a term of six years. The Vice Chairman is a member of the Senior Executive Service, and is appointed by the Secretary, with the approval of the President, and serves at the pleasure of the Secretary and is the Chief Operating Officer of the Board.    

Deputy Vice Chairmen (or DVCs) are members of the Board and of the Senior Executive Service and are appointed by the Secretary, by and with the approval of the President to serve as a member of Board's executive leadership team.   Their primary role is to provide oversight, guidance and management of the work product of the Veterans Law Judges, helping identify, consider, and resolve motions and appeals. Each DVC manages a team of a number of decision-writing judges and their staff counsel, with the Senior Deputy Vice Chairman performing administrative leadership functions in assisting the Vice Chairman with the day-to-day operations.  

Other executive staff include Chief Counsel, who oversees the Board's Quality Assurance and Improvement, CAVC Litigation Support, Customer Service and Records Management programs, and the executive director of Appellate Support, which is responsible for overseeing the non-decision-making support offices of the Board, such as human resources, logistics and supplies, and IT.

Veterans Law Judges (VLJ) 
The Secretary may appoint any number of members that he or she deems "necessary in order to conduct hearings and dispose of appeals properly before the Board in a timely manner". Those members are appointed by the Secretary, based on recommendations by the Chairman, and with the approval of the President,  and must be an attorney "in good standing" with any state bar.. Members are commissioned and titled as Veterans Law Judges (VLJs), and have similar duties and responsibilities to executive branch administrative law judges in the United States. , the Board consists of 108 VLJs, each of whom typically decide an appeal in a single-judge decision, although in certain cases, a panel decision of at least three VLJs may be formed.  The Board also employs nearly 800 attorney-advisors (titled as Associate Counsel, Counsel or Senior Counsel in Board decisions, depending on paygrade and tenure) which are staff attorneys also trained in veterans law who assist each VLJ review the facts of each case and write the decision, and a number of non-decision writing attorneys, professional and administrative staff to help execute the numerous other Board programs supporting the decision teams.

The Chairman, Vice Chairman, Deputy Vice Chairmen, and Chief Counsel are all members of the Board. However, the Chairman is prohibited by law from deciding appeals, unless he or she is sitting as part of a panel. In practice, however, rarely do any of the senior executives write a Board decision (outside of ruling on certain motions).

Appeals process 
The United States has the most comprehensive system of assistance for Veterans of any nation in the world, with roots that can be traced back to 1636, when the Pilgrims of Plymouth Colony were at war with the Pequot Indians. The Pilgrims passed a law that stated that disabled soldiers would be supported by the colony.  Later, the Continental Congress of 1776 encouraged enlistments during the Revolutionary War, providing pensions to disabled soldiers. In the early days of the Republic, individual states and communities provided direct medical and hospital care to Veterans. In 1811, the federal government authorized the first domiciliary and medical facility for Veterans. Also in the 19th century, the nation's Veterans assistance program was expanded to include benefits and pensions not only for Veterans, but for their widows and dependents.  This commitment is reflected in U.S. President Abraham Lincoln's words "to care for him who shall have borne the battle and for this widow, and his orphan," which is also the current motto of the United States Department of Veterans Affairs.

The Veterans appeals process is a complex, non-linear process, which is set in law and is unique from other standard appeals processes across the Federal and judicial systems.

Due to increasing difficulty to address the growing number of appeals, Congress passed the Veterans Appeals Improvement and Modernization Act of 2017 ("AMA") which was signed into law on August 23, 2017. AMA was implemented by the VA on February 19, 2019. Currently, the department is adjudicating claims and appeals under the previous legacy system and the new Appeals Modernization system. The department is aiming to finish the legacy backlog by 2023.

Procedure

Initial Claims 
A veteran seeking benefits from the Department must first file an original claim with an Agency of Original Jurisdiction (AOJ), which include the Veterans Benefits Administration for disability compensation, insurance, education, dependency and indemnity compensation(DIC), pension, and Veterans Readiness and Employment (VR&E) benefits claims, Veterans Health Administration for caregiver, medical payment and other non-medical related appeals, National Cemetery Administration for burial and other related eligibility decisions or the Office of General Counsel for decisions regarding interpretations of attorney fee agreements. Most commonly, the claim is from the Veterans Benefits Administration, seeking disability compensation for and an injury or medical condition developed while serving in the United States Armed Forces.; these cases comprised nearly 97% percent of all appeals in Fiscal Year 2021. The AOJ will then issue an original decision either granting or denying all or part of a claim for benefits.  If a claimant's application for benefits has been denied (or is otherwise averse to the claimant) by the AOJ, depending on the type of appeal (legacy or AMA), the claimant has one year from the date of the original decision to submit a notice of disagreement is filed with either the AOJ or the Board itself for a legacy case, or a choice between a supplemental claim, a higher-level review for an post-AMA case.

Legacy Appeals 
VA considers any decision issued prior to February 19, 2019, a legacy appeal, which was the effective date of the Appeals Modernization Act.  A feature of the legacy VA appeals process is a continuous open record that allows a Veteran, Survivor, or other appellant to submit new evidence and/or make new argument at any point from the beginning to the end of the appeals process.  Additionally, the duty to assist throughout the appeals process requires VA to develop further evidence on the Veteran's behalf and pursue new argument and theories of entitlement. Each time arguments are presented, and evidence is added/ obtained, the AOJ generally must issue another decision considering that evidence, which protracts the timeline for appellate resolution.  Legacy appeals have the most complex process, due to the aforementioned requirements that frequently resulted in the appellate delays at the AOJ level.

If a Veteran disagrees with all or part of a VA decision, he or she must first file a legacy Notice of Disagreement (NOD) with the AOJ within one year from the date of the letter notifying the Veteran of the claim decision. Prior to 2017, NODs could be filed on any form accepted by the Secretary, but since 2017, must be filed on the prescribed standard form. Once received, the local VA office will again review the Veteran's file again de novo and prepare a written explanation of why the claim was denied, known as the Statement of the Case (SOC).  Once completed, the AOJ will provide a copy to the claimant and his attorney, claims agent or Veteran Service Officer by mail.

After reviewing the Statement of the Case (SOC), the Veteran (appellant), and his or her attorney, claims agent, or Veterans Service Officer, has sixty (60) days to file a substantive appeal on a VA Form 9, Appeal to Board of Veterans' Appeals', identifying what issued they continue to disagree with.  At this time, the appellant may elect an optional hearing before a Veterans Law Judge or may allow the VLJ to decide the appeal on the evidence of record. After a substantive appeal is filed, the local VA office will certify and transfer the appeal to the Board of Veterans’ Appeals. The Board will hold a hearing (if one was requested) and will issue a decision to be prepared and mailed to the appellant. If the optional in-person, travel board or video teleconference hearing with a Veterans Law Judge at the Board of Veterans’ Appeals is selected on the VA Form 9, in the case of travel or videoconference hearings, be scheduled at the Regional Office (or other VA facility) closest to the appellant, or for Central Office hearings, at the Board's offices in Washington, DC. An appellant's travel costs for a hearing are not paid by VA.

The only caveat to this process is that because of the open record, evidence can be submitted at any time throughout the entire appellate process, up to and including before the Board issues its decision.  Any evidence or request that VA obtain any evidence that is submitted after the mailing of the Statement of the Case, the claimant is required to receive a Supplemental Statement of the Case (SSOC) after the local VA office reviews that evidence. This can complicate the process, because if the appeal has not yet been certified, the AOJ cannot certify the appeal to the Board until the SSOC is issued.  However, if the appeal has already been certified to the Board, the Board will need to receive the appellants express waiver to review the evidence in the first instance, waiving the possibility of the appeal being remanded simply for evidentiary development.

Post-AMA Appeal Process 

Any decision issued after February 19, 2019, is subject to the new regulations issued in the wake of the passage of the AMA. Those regulations wholly changed the structure and way that decision reviews are undertaken, such as offering two new non-appeal review options, which are allows a veteran to have their decision reviewed by the original agency prior to a Board appeal.  Veterans can now either file either an (a) supplemental claims, which are reviewed by the office initially issuing the decision based on new and relevant evidence, or (b) a Higher-Level Review, which reviews the previous decision de novo, by Senior Review Officers at specialized decision review centers. They may also file an appeal directly with the Board. This change removed the agency of original jurisdiction from the appeal process once the initial decision is issued, removing the time-consuming and burdensome steps in the Board appeal process that required the Veterans and AOJs to complete before an appeal could even reach the Board. While Veterans can choose any of the three review options (supplemental, higher-level review or Board Appeal) at any time after the initial decision is made, they can only have a specific issue in one lane at a time. In addition, if the Veteran chooses a higher-level review, that decision can only reviewed by appealing to the Board or by submitting a supplemental claim with new evidence

To initiate an appeal, the Veteran/appellant will need to file a Notice of Disagreement directly with the Board.  Once the NOD is docketed and reviewed by the Board, based on the choices made by the Veteran or appellant, their appeals are placed on one of three dockets, allowing them to choose the way they wish to have their claims and supporting evidence reviewed:

 In a Direct Review, the Board reviews the decision based on the evidence of record at the time the initial decision was issued. This means that the Board will not review any new evidence submitted after the initial decision was issued. This change would end the result of having claims remanded unnecessarily because of the addition of new evidence to the file after a decision was issued. Veterans can still file written arguments with their direct review and can also file a supplemental claim once the Board concludes its review, but new evidence would need to be submitted, and any evidence would be required to be "relevant" to proving a fact of the original claim that was not already decided.
 In an Evidence Submission Review, appellants are offered ninety (90) days to submit any new evidence that would be new and relevant to their appeal. This option allows the Veteran to develop their record with additional evidence based on the initial decision issued by the AOJ, with the hopes of overcoming the "more likely than not" standard that is built into the Veterans Claims system to prove their claims.
 In a Hearing Review, appellants are offered a hearing (Central Office, videoconference, or virtual) between them, their attorney, claims agent or Veteran Service Officer, and a Veterans Law Judge that will allow them to explain their case to the VLJ. Hearings are recorded, and transcripts are considered part of the evidentiary record. Veterans can also submit any new and relevant evidence to the record for 90 days after the hearing, which allows them to support the contentions made in their hearing with new and relevant evidence.

Judicial Review 
Decisions of the Board are non-precedential, meaning that each decision is specific and binding with respect to the individual claim and claimant before the Board. While appellants may review and cite to other Board decisions, the Board will not consider the decision or rulings in that case beyond the extent that it relates to the instant appeal. Once the Board issues its appeal, it is only reviewable by either the Board itself (in the instance of a motion for reconsideration), or by filing a Notice of Appeal with the United States Court of Appeals for Veterans Claims (CAVC), which sits separate from the Board, and provides judicial oversight and review of its decisions. Only a Veteran can file an appeal to CAVC; the Secretary is prohibited by law from doing so. Even so, CAVC reviews are limited in scope to questions of whether the Board's decision was not within the confines of the applicable Veterans law and regulations, other federal administrative procedures, and/or the Constitution. Findings of fact by the Board are not reviewable, unless the Court determines they are clearly erroneous.

Decisions from CAVC can then be appealed to the United States Court of Appeals for the Federal Circuit if a disagreement over a question of law remains, and finally, to the Supreme Court of the United States, if it should believe a significant issue of legal precedence remains.

See also

 United States Court of Appeals for Veterans Claims
 Veterans Benefits Administration
 Veterans Health Administration
 National Cemetery Administration

References

External links
Board of Veterans Appeals website.

United States Department of Veterans Affairs
United States Department of Veterans Affairs officials
Article I tribunals
Veterans' affairs law in the United States
1930 establishments in the United States
Courts and tribunals established in 1930